Im Jae-ho (born 13 December 1953) is a North Korean weightlifter. He competed in the men's flyweight event at the 1976 Summer Olympics.

References

1953 births
Living people
North Korean male weightlifters
Olympic weightlifters of North Korea
Weightlifters at the 1976 Summer Olympics
Place of birth missing (living people)